The 2021 British Superbike Championship season was the 34th British Superbike Championship season. Josh Brookes started the season as the reigning champion. The playoff system was reinstituted.

Playoff Changes
The playoff will now consist of eight riders instead of six.

Teams and riders

Race calendar and results

Championship standings

Riders' championship
Scoring system
Points are awarded to the top fifteen finishers. A rider has to finish the race to earn points.

References 

British Superbike Championship
2021 in British motorsport